The Danny Thomas-Diplomat Classic was a golf tournament in south Florida on the PGA Tour that was played only once, in early December 1969. Held at Diplomat Presidential Country Club, between Miami and Fort Lauderdale, it had a $125,000 purse and a winner's share of $25,000.  event of the year, it was played opposite a satellite event, the West End Classic in The Bahamas.

Six strokes back at the start of the final round, Arnold Palmer shot 65 (−7) and won by two strokes over runner-up Gay Brewer, the leader after each of the first three rounds. It was consecutive victories for the forty-year-old Palmer, who had broken a winless drought the previous week at the new Heritage Classic in southern South Carolina.

Although this tournament played for only one year, Danny Thomas continued to lend his name to a PGA Tour event for the next fifteen years  at the Danny Thomas Memphis Classic in southwest Tennessee.

Winner

References

Former PGA Tour events
Golf in Florida
1969 establishments in Florida
1969 disestablishments in Florida